This is a list of soccer clubs in Christmas Island.

Casino Royales
Drumsite Olympic
Kampong Rangers
Southpoint Wanderers
Christmas Island FC

See also

List of soccer clubs in Australia
List of soccer clubs in the Cocos (Keeling) Islands
List of soccer clubs in Norfolk Island

References

Christmas Island
Football clubs
Christmas Island
Soccer